The CMR Convention (full title Convention on the Contract for the International Carriage of Goods by Road) is a United Nations convention that was signed in Geneva on 19 May 1956. It relates to various legal issues concerning transportation of cargo by road. It has been ratified by the majority of European states. As of January 2022, it has been ratified by 58 states.

Based on the CMR, the International Road Transport Union (IRU) developed a standard CMR waybill. The CMR waybill is prepared in three languages. On the back is the text again in three languages. This aids the waybill in being accepted and recognised throughout Europe. Checked by customs and police, a transport document must be present when the shipment is transported. The document itself is not prescribed; there is a minimum of information required on the CMR. If hazardous substances are being shipped, some additional information is required, as described in ADR.

This consignment is completed by the sender. The consignment should only be completed with a ballpoint pen, typewriter or computer. The driver who uses the consignment should be familiar with the consignment, and with the waybill, able to inform the recipient about the importance of the various topics on the waybill.

As of 27 May 2008, according to an additional protocol to the CMR-convention, it is also possible to use an updated electronic consignment note – eCMR. As of February 2017, several solutions are available. ITD, Trade association for the Danish road transport of goods has developed a solution; the eCMR waybill. The eCMR is also available on the market in France, Spain and the Netherlands.

First cross-border usage of eCMR took place on 19 January 2017, between Spain and France supported by ASTIC (Asociación de Transporte Internacional por Carretera) and FNTR (Fédération Nationale des Transports Routiers).

On 24 February 2017, the UN reaffirmed its support to eCMR.

Details
The CMR-waybill consists of the following parts: 
red printing for sender 
blue printing for receiver 
green imprint on carrier
black print on second carrier (if present)

"CMR" is an abbreviation of the French title of the convention, Convention relative au contrat de transport international de marchandises par route.

See also
Warsaw Convention
TIR Convention

References

External links
Full text of the convention 
Ratifications.
UNILAW Database: Full text Status Caselaw Bibliography

Treaties concluded in 1956
Treaties entered into force in 1961
United Nations Economic Commission for Europe treaties
Transport treaties
Treaties of Albania
Treaties of Armenia
Treaties of Austria
Treaties of Azerbaijan
Treaties of Belarus
Treaties of Belgium
Treaties of Bosnia and Herzegovina
Treaties of the People's Republic of Bulgaria
Treaties of Croatia
Treaties of Cyprus
Treaties of Czechoslovakia
Treaties of the Czech Republic
Treaties of Denmark
Treaties of Estonia
Treaties of Finland
Treaties of France
Treaties of Georgia (country)
Treaties of West Germany
Treaties of East Germany
Treaties of Greece
Treaties of the Hungarian People's Republic
Treaties of Iran
Treaties of Ireland
Treaties of Italy
Treaties of Jordan
Treaties of Kazakhstan
Treaties of Kyrgyzstan
Treaties of Latvia
Treaties of Lebanon
Treaties of Lithuania
Treaties of Luxembourg
Treaties of Malta
Treaties of Mongolia
Treaties of Montenegro
Treaties of Morocco
Treaties of the Netherlands
Treaties of Norway
Treaties of the Polish People's Republic
Treaties of the Estado Novo (Portugal)
Treaties of Moldova
Treaties of the Socialist Republic of Romania
Treaties of the Soviet Union
Treaties of Serbia and Montenegro
Treaties of Yugoslavia
Treaties of Slovakia
Treaties of Slovenia
Treaties of Spain
Treaties of Sweden
Treaties of Switzerland
Treaties of Syria
Treaties of Tajikistan
Treaties of North Macedonia
Treaties of Tunisia
Treaties of Turkey
Treaties of Turkmenistan
Treaties of Ukraine
Treaties of the United Kingdom
Treaties of Uzbekistan
1956 in Switzerland
Treaties extended to Gibraltar
Treaties extended to Guernsey
Treaties extended to the Isle of Man
Treaties extended to Greenland
Treaties extended to the Faroe Islands
1956 in transport
Treaties extended to West Berlin
UNIDROIT treaties